Aewol is a town located in Jeju City, Jeju Province, South Korea.

History 
Timeline of Aewol-eup history:

 1935: Sinwu-myeon (신우면) was renamed to Aewol-myeon (애월면)
 December 1980: Aewol-myeon was designated as a Town

Educational Institutions 

 Aewol Elementary (애월초등학교) 
 Gwaggeum Elementary (곽금초등학교)
 Uhdo Elementary (어도초등학교)
 Nabeup Elementary (납읍초등학교)
 Gueom Elementary (구엄초등학교)
 Hagwi Elementary (하귀초등학교)
 Mulme Elementary (물메초등학교)
 Jangjeon Elementary (장전초등학교)
 Gwangryung Elementary (광령초등학교)
 Hagwiil Elementary (하귀일초등학교)
 Aewol Middle (애월중학교)
 Shinum Middle (신엄중학교)
 Kwiil Middle (귀일중학교)
 Aewol High (애월고등학교)
 Jeju Foreign Language High School (제주외국어고등학교) 
 Youngsong School (제주영송학교)

References

Towns and townships in Jeju Province